, (stylized as ΛFΓO SΛMUΓΛI RESUΓΓECTIOΠ) is a 2009 Japanese anime television film sequel to the miniseries Afro Samurai, starring Samuel L. Jackson and Lucy Liu. It aired on Spike on January 25, 2009.

Plot
Lacking any sense of purpose after taking revenge on Justice, the Number 1 headband bearer, Afro Samurai, spends his days making wooden sculptures of historical figures and has not fought a duel in years. Jinno, his sworn brother who is now an emotionless cyborg, and his sister, Lady Sio, ambush and beat him severely, while stealing the headband and his deceased father Rokutaro's mandible. Sio tells Afro that they will resurrect Rokutaro and use him for vengeance, challenging Afro to find the Number 2 headband if he still has the will to fight.

After getting his rusted sword reforged, Afro goes to a gambling house, where the last surviving member of the Empty Seven Clan, Brother 3, challenges him to a dice game for the identity of the Number 2. Afro discovers Brother 3 cheating and forces him to reveal that the Number 2 belonged to the ronin Shichigoro. Afro unknowingly saves Shichigoro's adopted son Kotaro, but then kills the swordsman in front of him, leaving Kotaro to mourn his father and swear revenge. Claiming the Number 2 headband, Afro goes on to destroy three cyborg warriors, who turn out to be Sio's foster brothers and sister. Sio uses forbidden science to resurrect Rokutaro, turning him into a soulless warrior.

With Afro injured by his previous fight, Rokutaro easily beats him with his superior strength and speed, choking his son until he loses consciousness. The sight of Afro dying causes Jinno to remember the bond they once shared as brothers, and he attacks Rokutaro, who mutilates his body. Sio tries to save her brother, and Rokutaro impales her through Jinno's body. As they lay dying, a spark from Jinno's body travels through Sio's spilled blood and revives Afro. He accepts that Rokutaro is not his real father and kills him. Afro retrieves the Number 1 headband and gives the Number 2 to Kotaro, telling him that he will be ready for when he wants to avenge Shichigoro. While Afro travels to Mount Shumi and searches for a challenger as the Number 1, his imaginary companion Ninja Ninja reappears before him, stating about the endless cycle of revenge and bloodshed.

Difference between versions
The ending differs between the DVD and television broadcast editions of the film. In the television version, Afro reclaims the headband and runs into a masked man as the image of Justice appears for a split second. In the Director's Cut DVD edition, Afro reclaims the Number 1 headband. After the credits, Justice reappears.

Voice cast
 Samuel L. Jackson – Afro, Ninja Ninja
 Phil LaMarr – Teen Afro
 Lucy Liu – Lady Sio
 Ariel Winter – Young Sio
 Yuri Lowenthal – Jinnosuke/Kuma
 Mark Hamill – Bin
 Jeff Bennett – Brother 3
 S. Scott Bullock – Professor Dharman
 Grey DeLisle – Tomoe
 Greg Eagles – Rokutaro
 Zachary Gordon – Kotaro
 Liam O'Brien – Shichigoro
 RZA – DJ

Music
The RZA Presents: Afro Samurai Resurrection OST was released on January 27, 2009.

Releases
The film aired for Spike on January 25, 2009. It was released on DVD on February 3, 2009, and for the PlayStation Store in May 2009. The film premiered at the San Diego Asian Film Festival in October 16, 2009. It aired for Funimation's YouTube stream, from July 31 to August 5, 2011. For the United Kingdom release on Netflix, the film was among one the initial titles for the January 2012 launch.

Reception
Zac Bertschy of Anime News Network stated about Afro Samurai: Resurrection that "it's a gorgeous film," with "incredible animation, spectacular action setpieces  and a thumping score by Ghostface". Zac noted that the plot is just "window dressing" and that if it's about anything it's about "cool". Zac criticized that the film as just an excuse to string fight scenes together and that the farther it goes on it becomes clearer how "weak the writing is".

Hyper commends the anime for its art, saying, "stylised poses and sharp, dynamic visuals have long been a trademark element of this series, and they hold true [in the anime]." For the Primetime Emmy Award for Outstanding Animated Program, the film lost to Foster's Home for Imaginary Friends. Though film's art director, Shigemi Ikeda, won a Primetime Emmy award for "Outstanding Individual Achievement In Animation".

References

External links
 Official website
 

2000s Japanese films
2009 anime films
2009 television films
2009 films
Anime films based on manga
Samurai films
Funimation
Gonzo (company)
Films scored by RZA
Resurrection in film
Japanese sequel films
Films directed by Fuminori Kizaki